UK Theatre (formerly the Theatrical Management Association) was founded in 1894 as the Theatrical Managers Association, with Sir Henry Irving as its first president. There are however records of the activity of a Theatrical Managers Association going back to at least 1866.  Irving was still president in 1901.

UK Theatre Awards
The association presented the TMA Awards annually since 1991, which subsequently became the UK Theatre Awards in 2011. The UK Theatre Awards are a nationwide annual celebration of the outstanding achievements of theatre across the UK.

References

External links
UK Theatre

Arts organizations established in the 1890s
Arts organizations established in 1894
Theatrical organisations in the United Kingdom